Pietro Augustoni (2 September 1741 – 12 October 1815) was an Italian architect of the Rococo and Neoclassical period, mainly active in the Marche region of Italy, including Fermo, a region under the governance of the Papal States.

Biography
Augustoni was born in Como in Northern Italy. He would design a number of churches, including:
 Collegiata dei Filippini, Fermo
 Collegiata Santo Stefano, Monte San Giusto  
 San Filippo Neri, Treia  
 San Filippo Neri, Recanati

References

1741 births
1815 deaths
18th-century Italian architects
17th-century Italian architects